Peterson's algorithm (or Peterson's solution) is a concurrent programming algorithm for mutual exclusion that allows two or more processes to share a single-use resource without conflict, using only shared memory for communication. It was formulated by Gary L. Peterson in 1981. While Peterson's original formulation worked with only two processes, the algorithm can be generalized for more than two.

The algorithm 
The algorithm uses two variables: flag and turn. A flag[n] value of true indicates that the process n wants to enter the critical section. Entrance to the critical section is granted for process P0 if P1 does not want to enter its critical section and if P1 has given priority to P0 by setting turn to 0.

The algorithm satisfies the three essential criteria to solve the critical-section problem. The while condition works even with preemption.

The three criteria are mutual exclusion, progress, and bounded waiting.

Since turn can take on one of two values, it can be replaced by a single bit, meaning that the algorithm requires only three bits of memory.

Mutual exclusion 
P0 and P1 can never be in the critical section at the same time. If P0 is in its critical section, then flag[0] is true. In addition, either flag[1] is false (meaning that P1 has left its critical section), or turn is 0 (meaning that P1 is just now trying to enter the critical section, but graciously waiting), or P1 is at label P1_gate (trying to enter its critical section, after setting flag[1] to true but before setting turn to 0 and busy waiting). So if both processes are in their critical sections, then we conclude that the state must satisfy flag[0] and flag[1] and turn = 0 and turn = 1. No state can satisfy both turn = 0 and turn = 1, so there can be no state where both processes are in their critical sections.
(This recounts an argument that is made rigorous in.)

Progress 
Progress is defined as the following: if no process is executing in its critical section and some processes wish to enter their critical sections, then only those processes that are not executing in their remainder sections can participate in making the decision as to which process will enter its critical section next. Note that for a process or thread, the remainder sections are parts of the code that are not related to the critical section. This selection cannot be postponed indefinitely. A process cannot immediately re-enter the critical section if the other process has set its flag to say that it would like to enter its critical section.

Bounded waiting 
Bounded waiting, or bounded bypass, means that the number of times a process is bypassed by another process after it has indicated its desire to enter the critical section is bounded by a function of the number of processes in the system. In Peterson's algorithm, a process will never wait longer than one turn for entrance to the critical section.

Filter algorithm: Peterson's algorithm for more than two processes 

The filter algorithm generalizes Peterson's algorithm to  processes. Instead of a boolean flag, it requires an integer variable per process, stored in a single-writer/multiple-reader (SWMR) atomic register, and  additional variables in similar registers. The registers can be represented in pseudocode as arrays:

 level : array of N integers
 last_to_enter : array of N − 1 integers

Processes advance from one room to the next, finishing in room , which is the critical section. Specifically, to acquire a lock, process  executes

 i ← ProcessNo
 for ℓ from 0 to N − 1 exclusive
     level[i] ← ℓ
     last_to_enter[ℓ] ← i
     while last_to_enter[ℓ] = i and there exists k ≠ i, such that level[k] ≥ ℓ
         wait

To release the lock upon exiting the critical section, process  sets  to −1.

That this algorithm achieves mutual exclusion can be proven as follows. At level zero, then, even if all  processes were to enter waiting room zero at the same time, no more than  will proceed to the next room, the final one finding itself the last to enter the room. Similarly, at the next level,  will proceed, etc., until at the final level, only one process is allowed to leave the waiting room and enter the critical section, giving mutual exclusion.

Unlike the two-process Peterson algorithm, the filter algorithm does not guarantee bounded waiting.

Note
When working at the hardware level, Peterson's algorithm is typically not needed to achieve atomic access. 
Some processors have special instructions, like test-and-set or compare-and-swap, which, by locking the memory bus, can be used to provide mutual exclusion in SMP systems.

Most modern CPUs reorder memory accesses to improve execution efficiency (see memory ordering for types of reordering allowed). Such processors invariably give some way to force ordering in a stream of memory accesses, typically through a memory barrier instruction. Implementation of Peterson's and related algorithms on processors that reorder memory accesses generally requires use of such operations to work correctly to keep sequential operations from happening in an incorrect order. Note that reordering of memory accesses can happen even on processors that don't reorder instructions (such as the PowerPC processor in the Xbox 360).

Most such CPUs also have some sort of guaranteed atomic operation, such as XCHG on x86 processors and load-link/store-conditional on Alpha, MIPS, PowerPC, and other architectures. These instructions are intended to provide a way to build synchronization primitives more efficiently than can be done with pure shared memory approaches.

See also 
 Dekker's algorithm
 Eisenberg & McGuire algorithm
 Lamport's bakery algorithm
 Szymański's algorithm
 Semaphores

Footnotes

External links
https://elixir.bootlin.com/linux/latest/source/arch/arm/mach-tegra/sleep.S Peterson's algorithm implementation

Concurrency control algorithms
Articles with example C code